Malcolm Matthew Scott (born July 10, 1961) is a former professional American football player who played in the National Football League as a tight end for the New York Giants and New Orleans Saints. He played college football for the LSU Tigers football team of Louisiana State University. He was born in New Orleans, Louisiana and played high school football at St. Augustine.

At LSU, Scott caught 79 passes for 877 yards and five touchdowns. His receptions and yards both rank third by a tight end in LSU history. He was named a first-team All-Southeastern Conference selection by the Associated Press in 1981.

In the NFL, Scott appeared in 16 games in 1983 for the Giants, catching 17 passes for 206 yards. With the Saints in 1987, he played in three games and had six receptions for 35 yards.

References

Living people
1961 births
LSU Tigers football players
St. Augustine High School (New Orleans) alumni
New Orleans Saints players
New York Giants players
Players of American football from New Orleans
American football tight ends
National Football League replacement players